Merrilyn is a feminine given name. It is similar to Merilyn and Marilyn.

List of people with the name 

 Merrilyn Gann (born 1963), Canadian actress
 Merrilyn Goos, Australian mathematician
 Merrilyn Rose (born 1955), Australian politician
 Anne Merrilyn Tolley (born 1953), New Zealand politician

Feminine given names
English feminine given names